Bacillus badius is a Gram-positive aerobic spore-forming bacillus. Originally isolated from human intestines and described in 1919, B. badius was later found in a sample of figs. Novel enzymes, including a restriction enzyme and penicillin G acylase, have been purified from this bacterial species.

References

Further reading

External links
Type strain of Bacillus badius at BacDive -  the Bacterial Diversity Metadatabase

badius
Bacteria described in 1919